This is a list of private schools in the U.S. state of Mississippi:

Adams County Christian School
Amite School Center
Annunciation Catholic School
Bass Memorial Academy (Boarding)
Bayou Academy
Benedict Day School
Benton Academy 
Brookhaven Academy
Calhoun Academy 
Calvary Christian School
Canton Academy
Carroll Academy
Cathedral High School 
Cedar Lake Christian Academy 
Central Academy (Closed)
Central Delta Academy (Closed)
Central Hinds Academy
Central Holmes Christian School
Centreville Academy
Chamberlain-Hunt Academy (Closed)
Christ Covenant School
Christ Missionary and Industrial
Christian Collegiate Academy 
Claiborne Educational Foundation 
Clinton Christian Academy
Coast Episcopal School
Columbia Academy
Copiah Academy
Cross Creek Christian Academy
Cruger-Tchula Academy (Closed)
Deer Creek School
Delta Academy
Delta Streets Academy
Desoto County Academy
Desoto School
East Holmes Academy (Closed)
East Rankin Academy
Education Center School
Faith Christian School
FBC of Taylorsville Christian School
First Presbyterian Day School
French Camp Academy (Boarding)
Friendship Christian Academy
Gateway Christian Academy (Wiggins)
Grace Baptist School
Grace Christian School
Grace Community School
Green River Boys Ranch
Greenville Christian School
Hartfield Academy
Hebron Christian School
Heidelberg Academy (Closed)
Heritage Academy
Hillcrest Christian School
Humphreys Academy 
Immanuel Center for Christian Education 
Indianola Academy 
Jackson Academy
Jackson Preparatory School
Kirk Academy
Lamar School
Laurel Christian School
Leake Academy
Lee Academy
Madison-Ridgeland Academy
Magnolia Heights School
Manchester Academy
Marshall Academy 
Mother Goose Christian Academy 
Mt. Salus Christian School (Clinton)
Newton County Academy 
North Delta School
North Sunflower Academy
Northpoint Christian School
Oak Hill Academy
Our Lady Academy (girls only)
Oxford University School
Park Place Christian Academy
Parklane Academy
Pillow Academy
Pine Hills Christian Academy
Pinelake Christian School (closed)
Piney Woods Country Life School (Boarding)
Porters Chapel Academy
Prentiss Christian School 
Presbyterian Christian School (Hattiesburg)
Presbyterian Day School-Cleveland 
Rebul Academy
Resurrection Catholic School (Pascagoula, Mississippi)
Russell Christian Academy
Sacred Heart Catholic School
School of Excellence (Hattiesburg) 
Sharkey-Issaquena Academy
Simpson County Academy
St. Andrew's Episcopal School
St. Georges Episcopal Day School
St. Joseph Catholic School (Madison, Mississippi)
St. Joseph Catholic High School (Greenville, Mississippi)
St. Stanislaus (Day & Boarding -- boys only)
Starkville Academy 
Starkville Christian School
Strider Academy (Closed)
Sylva Bay Academy 
Tri-County Academy 
Trinity Episcopal Day School (Closed)
Trinity Pre-School
Tunica Academy
Tupelo Christian Preparatory School
Union Academy 
Union Church Christian Academy
University of Mississippi High School
The Veritas School (Closed)
Vicksburg Catholic School (St. Francis Xavier/ St. Aloyisus High School)
Vicksburg Community School 
Victory Christian Academy (Columbus)
Washington School
Wayne Academy
Westminster Academy 
Wilkinson County Christian Academy
Winona Christian School
Winston Academy

External links

Private